Danijel Đokić join the cast. Ivan Bekjarev departed the cast at the end of the season.

Plot

In this season, the character of Vuk's son Majkl became a regular and the character of Bane, Jelena's boss was introduced in episode 15. Also, Boban is missing and he is in Siniša's house in the village. Siniša is Sonja's husband and Sofija's brother-in-law.

Cast

Episodes

Jelena (TV series)